The eighth season of La Voz premiered on September 17, 2021, on Antena 3. Alejandro Sanz is the only coach returning from the previous season. He was joined by former coaches Malú and Luis Fonsi, and first-time coach Pablo Alborán, replacing Laura Pausini, Pablo López and Antonio Orozco.

Inés Manzano was announced the winner of the eighth season, marking Pablo Alborán's first win as a coach.

Coaches and host 

On 5 May 2021, Antena 3 announced that the show was renewed for its eighth season. A few days later, it was confirmed that Alejandro Sanz would be the only coach remaining on the panel. Sanz is joined by debuting coach Pablo Alborán and returning coaches Malú and Luis Fonsi, who last coached in seasons five and six, respectively. Miriam Rodríguez also comes back to coach the "Comeback Stage". Meanwhile, Eva González remains as the show's presenter.

For the Battles and Knockouts, the advisors this season were: María José Llergo for Team Alborán, Beret for Team Malú, Greeicy for Team Alejandro, and David Bisbal for Team Fonsi.

Teams 

 Main competition color key
  Winner
  Runner-up
  Third place
  Fourth place
  Eliminated in the Live Semifinal
  Eliminated in the Live Playoffs
  Eliminated in the Final knockout
  Stolen in the Knockouts
  Eliminated in the Knockouts
  Eliminated but selected to participate in Comeback Stage
  Eliminated in the Battles
 Comeback Stage color key
  Won the Comeback Stage
  Eliminated in the Third round
  Eliminated in the Second round
  Eliminated in the First round

Blind Auditions 
In the Blind auditions, each coach had to complete their teams with 14 contestants. Each coach had three "blocks" to prevent another coach from getting a contestant. Twelve participants who got no chair turned were chosen to participate on The Comeback Stage.

The Great Battles 
The battles round was broadcast on October 29. The coaches divide their contestants into four groups of three or four artists, depending on their music style. They perform a selected song by their respective coach together, and each coach decides how many, or even if any one of them advances in the competition. Coaches receive help from their advisors: María José Llergo for Team Alborán, Beret for Team Malú, Greeicy for Team Alejandro and David Bisbal for Team Fonsi. Out of 14 contestants, only seven contestants per team advance to the Knockouts.

Knockouts

Phase 1: Knockouts 
The knockouts round began airing on 6 November. Each coach's seven artists performed, and one is given the fast pass, advancing to the live shows. Out of the other six, three are chosen by their coach to be in the "Red zone". As artists are put in the "red zone", they can be stolen by other coaches. In this case, any artist who was set to be eliminated will take their place.

Phase 2: Final Knockouts 
Each coach has three artists in the "Red zone", who gained a second chance to perform in the Final Knockouts. Joining the fast pass and stolen artists, two contestants will win the final knockout: one chosen by their coach, and the other chosen by the public in the audience.

The Comeback Stage 
The Comeback Stage, exclusive to Atresplayer and the show's official YouTube channel, returns this season. In the first round, after failing to turn a chair in the blind auditions, 12 artists had the chance to be selected by the fifth coach Miriam Rodríguez and sang in duels of two. In the second round, one battles' loser and two knockouts' losers were selected by Miriam to sing in duels of three with two of the six winners from the first round. In the third round, the three winners from the second round sing, and two of them advance to the Live Playoffs. One of them will be chosen by Miriam as the "Comeback Stage" winner.

First round

Second round

Third round

Live Playoffs

Live shows 
This season, the live performance shows returned. During the Playoffs and Semifinal, the audience in the studio voted for their favorites to advance into the next round. For the Finale, the public at home eventually was able to vote for the winner.

Week 1: Playoffs (November 27) 
The Playoffs started off with "The Comeback Stage" artists performing. Coach Miriam then chose Tyler Middlemiss as the winner, choosing to join Team Alborán.

Following that, all the participants performed in team order. Even though the show was live, the public at home was not able to vote; the audience in the studio was who voted for one artist, while each coach chose a second artist to advance into the Semifinal.

Week 2: Semifinal (December 11) 
The Semifinal started off with all the Top 8 performing a song together. Throughout the rest of the night, the show included each artist's solo performance, each coach performing with their two semifinalists, and each advisor singing with their advised participants. At the end of the episode, the audience voted, choosing four artists to advance to the Finale.

With the advancements of Julio Benavente and Karina Parsian, Alejandro Sanz became the third coach to have more than one artist in the finale, behind Laura Pausini and Antonio Orozco in last season. With the eliminations of Ezequiel Montoya and Besay Pérez, Malú no longer has any more artists on her team, marking the third time which a coach not being represented in the finale, behind Alejandro Sanz and Pablo Lopez in last season.

Week 3: Grand Final 
The Grand Final of this season aired on December 18, 2022. In the Grand Final, the four finalists will each perform a duet with a guest and then a solo performance. The public will vote to decide the winner of the season.

The show invited Manuel Carrasco, Vanesa Martín, Pablo López, Niña Pastori, Pastora Soler, Morat and Antonio José to join the artists for duets and other performances. In particular, David Barrull the winner of the second season of La Voz, María Parrado the winner of the first season of La Voz Kids joined to perform. Antonio José was also a contestant from previous season, he was crowned the winner of the third season of La Voz.

Inés Manzano was announced the winner of the eighth season, marking Pablo Alborán's first win as a coach.

Elimination chart 
Artist's info

  Team Alborán
  Team Malú
  Team Alejandro
  Team Fonsi

Result details

  Winner
  Runner-up
  Third place
  Fourth place
  Saved by the public
  Saved by her/his coach
  Eliminated

Notes

References 

Spanish television series
Spanish television seasons
The Voice (franchise)